Halbertia is a genus of mites in the family Laelapidae.

Species
 Halbertia oblongus (Halbert, 1915)

References

Laelapidae